Dame Fortune may refer to:

Fortuna, goddess
Dame Fortune, character in the Roman de Fauvel
Dame Fortune, from the Tarot Wheel of Fortune card
Dame Fortune (album), album by RJD2 2016
"Dame Fortune", a song by XTC from the album Fuzzy Warbles Volume 1